Extreme geographical points of Slovenia:

Longitude and latitude
 North: , Budinci, Municipality of Šalovci,
 South: , Damelj, Municipality of Črnomelj,
 East: , Benica Municipality of Lendava,
 West: , Breginj, Municipality of Kobarid.

Elevation
Highest point Triglav (2864m) 
Lowest point Adriatic Sea (0) 

Geography of Slovenia
Slovenia
Extreme